Take It Easy is a 2015 Hindi children's film written and directed by Sunil Prem Vyas and produced by Dharmesh Pandit. The film is starring Vikram Gokhale, Raj Zutshi, Supriya Karnik, Dipannita Sharma  and Anang Desai.

Cast
 Vikram Gokhale
 Dipannita Sharma
 Raj Zutshi
 Anang Desai
 Joy Sengupta
 Sulbha Arya
 Arun Behl
 Vijay Kashyap
 Supriya Karnik
 Jyoti Gauba
 Yash Ghanekar
 Prasad Reddy
 Smera Jadhav

Soundtrack

Critical reception
Shubhra Gupta of The Indian Express gave it 1.5/5 stars, stating, With some easy moments, this film could have been easier to watch, but not when there is no break from loud background music, loud melodrama, and loud dialogues. Even the children, who all try hard to be as natural as possible, are weighed down under all the preachiness.
Renuka Vyavahare of The Times of India gave it 2/5 stars and opined, Their message of how 'everything is judged on the basis of money than character today' comes across clearly. However, the execution could have been crisper, more authentic. The story keeps beating around the bush for no reason, when the impact has already been made. The dramatization is uncalled for, especially towards the end. What could have been an otherwise heartrending climax, gets faltered when stretched for no rhyme or reason. Why beg for tears?" Webduniya gave it 2/5 stars. Shakti Shetty of Mid-day gave it 3/5 stars and opined, On the big screen, both Yash Ghanekar as well as Prasad Reddy put in a fine performance as rivals-turned-BFFs. Their more seasoned colleagues are remarkable but still, the story revolves around the two. They are the undisputed stars. Last year hardly witnessed a memorable children's film. With this venture, one can now expect many more from 2015.

References

3. Director-Writer-Editor Sunil Prem Vyas from Darpan Theatre & Cine Arts (DTCA)

External links

2010s Hindi-language films
Indian drama films
2015 drama films
2015 films
Hindi-language drama films